Scototrechus is a genus of beetles in the family Carabidae, containing the following species:

 Scototrechus hardingi Townsend, 2010
 Scototrechus morti Townsend, 2010
 Scototrechus orcinus Britton, 1962

References

Trechinae